The Gadsby Building is an historic building in Portland, Oregon. Completed in 1906, the structure is part of the Portland Thirteenth Avenue Historic District, which is listed on the National Register of Historic Places.

References

External links

1906 establishments in Oregon
Buildings and structures completed in 1906
Buildings and structures in Portland, Oregon
Pearl District, Portland, Oregon